Hypochondriac is the third studio album by American surf-punk band the Frights, released August 24, 2018 on Epitaph Records.

Background 
Frontman Mikey Carnevale explains starting work on Hypochondriac in his own terms:

The band entered Balboa Recording in Los Angeles in February 2018 with producer and Fidlar frontman Zac Carper, spending two straight weeks recording songs. Hypochondriac marked the debut of guitarist Jordan Clark and was the band's first release for Epitaph Records.

Track listing 

Notes
 "Crutch" is stylized in all uppercase.
 Some sources credit Zac Carper as a co-writer. According to The Frights official Bandcamp page, Mikey Carnevale is the sole writer of the album.

Personnel 
The Frights
 Mikey Carnevale – lead vocals, guitar
 Jordan Clark – guitar
 Richard Dotson – bass guitar
 Marc Finn – drums

Production
 David Baker – mixing assistant 
Greg Calbi – mastering
Zac Carper – producer
 Rowan Daly – photography
 David Jerkovich – engineer
 Rob Kinelski – mixing
 Jason Link and the Frights – layout and design

Charts

References 

2018 albums
The Frights albums
Epitaph Records albums